Bambusa amplexicaulis is a species of Bambusa bamboo.

Distribution 
The bamboo species is first described in an open field of Xihu Village, of Lianping, Guangdong province, China. It is often found in temperate places in Asia.

Description 
It grows up to 300 cm long with its woody stem growing to 25 mm diameter.

References 

amplexicaulis